Matthew Dick (born 3 November 1994) is a former professional Australian rules footballer who played with the Carlton Football Club in the Australian Football League (AFL).

He spent two years on their list but did not get a senior game and was delisted. He made his debut against  in Round 4, 2015, and played a total of six senior games in his debut season for the club.

In August 2016, Dick was delisted from Carlton.

Statistics

|- style="background-color: #EAEAEA"
! scope="row" style="text-align:center" | 2013
|
| 31 || 0 || — || — || — || — || — || — || — || — || — || — || — || — || — || —
|-
! scope="row" style="text-align:center" | 2014
|
| 31 || 0 || — || — || — || — || — || — || — || — || — || — || — || — || — || —
|- style="background-color: #EAEAEA"
! scope="row" style="text-align:center" | 2015
|
| 31 || 6 || 0 || 2 || 40 || 30 || 70 || 20 || 12 || 0.0 || 0.3 || 6.7 || 5.0 || 11.7 || 3.3 || 2.0
|-
! scope="row" style="text-align:center" | 2016
|
| 31 || 0 || — || — || — || — || — || — || — || — || — || — || — || — || — || —
|- class="sortbottom"
! colspan=3| Career
! 6
! 0
! 2
! 40
! 30
! 70
! 20
! 12
! 0.0
! 0.3
! 6.7
! 5.0
! 11.7
! 3.3
! 2.0
|}

References

External links

1994 births
Living people
Carlton Football Club players
Calder Cannons players
Australian rules footballers from Victoria (Australia)
Preston Football Club (VFA) players